Campbell Scott (born July 19, 1961) is an American actor, producer and director. His roles include Steve Dunne in Singles, Mark Usher in House of Cards, Joseph Tobin in Damages, and Richard Parker in The Amazing Spider-Man and The Amazing Spider-Man 2, as well as narration in The Men Who Built America.

Early life
Scott was born on July 19, 1961, in New York City, the son of American actor George C. Scott (1927–1999) and Canadian-American actress Colleen Dewhurst (1924–1991). He graduated from John Jay High School with friend Stanley Tucci before graduating from Lawrence University in 1983. His brother is Alexander Scott. He also has one paternal half-sister, actress Devon Scott.

Career
Scott's first role was in the 1987 film Five Corners, as a policeman. In 1990, Scott played a lead role in the ground-breaking film Longtime Companion, which chronicles the early years of the AIDS/HIV epidemic and its impact upon a group of American friends. In the following year he appeared briefly in Kenneth Branagh-directed, Dead Again, and co-starred in the movie Dying Young (in which his mother also appeared) alongside Julia Roberts. He also appeared in the 1992 Cameron Crowe movie Singles alongside Bridget Fonda and Kyra Sedgwick, and in 1996, he teamed up with Stanley Tucci to direct the film Big Night. The film met with critical acclaim and was nominated for the Grand Jury Prize at the Sundance Film Festival. For their work, Scott and Tucci won both the New York Film Critics Circle Award and the Boston Society of Film Critics Award for Best New Director.

In 2002 he was awarded the Best Actor prize from the National Board of Review for his performance in Roger Dodger. Scott starred in Six Degrees on ABC in 2006.

In 2004 he starred alongside Adam Butcher, in Saint Ralph.

In 2005–2006 Scott served as the reader for the audiobook versions of Stephen King's bestsellers The Shining and Cell, and for Ernest Hemingway's For Whom the Bell Tolls.

In 2007 Scott lent his voice for the narration of a Chevron Corporation television ad, as well as the Iraq War documentary film, No End in Sight. He also appeared in the romantic comedy Music and Lyrics, starring Hugh Grant and Drew Barrymore.  Next up for Scott was the 2009 drama Handsome Harry. Scott also had a recurring role on the USA drama Royal Pains, as Boris Kuester von Jurgens-Ratenicz.

On August 28, 2009 TVGuide.com confirmed Scott was cast for the third season of Damages. Scott was a series regular, playing Joe Tobin, the son of indicted Bernie Madoff-like Louis Tobin (Len Cariou). The season aired from January to April 2010.

In May 2010 Scott provided the voice-over for a new Häagen-Dazs TV commercial called "Ode to Flavor". The ad was created by Goodby, Silverstein & Partners, directed by Noah Marshall with art direction by Croix Cagnon. He played the role of Richard Parker, the father of Peter Parker, in the 2012 film The Amazing Spider-Man. Scott reprised his role in the 2014 film The Amazing Spider-Man 2.

From December 2015 to March 2016 Scott appeared as Lloyd Dallas in the Broadway revival of Noises Off.

In 2017 he collaborated with Dutch DJ and producer Ferry Corsten on Blueprint, an album combining Trance music and science fiction, in which he can be heard as the story's narrator.

In 2019 Scott portrayed the lead role of Ebenezer Scrooge in a Broadway adaptation of Charles Dickens's A Christmas Carol written by Jack Thorne and directed by Matthew Warchus.

Scott plays Dr. Lewis Dodgson (replacing Cameron Thor) in Jurassic World Dominion, the sixth film in the Jurassic Park franchise, which was released in June 2022.

Personal life
Scott has two sons. He lives with his family in northwest Connecticut.

Filmography

Film

Television

Video Games

Music albums

References

External links
 
 
 
 

1961 births
American male film actors
American film directors
American male stage actors
American male television actors
American people of Canadian descent
Lawrence University alumni
Living people
Male actors from New York City
Audiobook narrators
Film producers from New York (state)
John Jay High School (Cross River, New York) alumni